Project Runway Season 4 was the fourth season of Project Runway, Bravo's reality competition for fashion designers.  The season premiered November 14, 2007. Returning as judges were supermodel Heidi Klum; fashion designer Michael Kors; and Nina Garcia, Elle magazine fashion director. Tim Gunn, chief creative officer at Liz Claiborne, Inc., again acts as a mentor to the contestants.

Through a series of weekly challenges, contestants were eliminated, leaving three finalists left who then went on to show their designs in the final episodes at New York Fashion Week. The winner, Christian Siriano, received prizes including: an editorial feature in Elle, $100,000 from TRESemmé to start his own line, the opportunity to sell a fashion line on Bluefly.com, and a 2008 Saturn Astra automobile. Siriano mentors the designers on Project Runway from season 17.

Elisa Jimenez, Sweet P Vaughn and Rami Kashou later appeared in Project Runway: All Stars in 2012, where Elisa placed 13th, Sweet P Placed 12th, and Rami came in 8th place out of 13.  In 2014, Chris March appeared in the fourth season of All Stars, coming in 12th place out of 14.

Contestants

Designers
The 15 contestants were (in order of elimination):

(ages listed are the designers' ages at the time the show was taped in the summer of 2007)

Models

Challenges

 The designer won Project Runway Season 4.
 The designer was advanced to Fashion Week.
 The designer won the challenge.
 The designer came in second but did not win the challenge.
 The designer had one of the highest scores for that challenge, but did not win.
 The designer had one of the lowest scores for that challenge, but was not eliminated.
 The designer was in the bottom two, but was not eliminated.
 The designer lost and was out of the competition.
 The designer withdrew from the competition.

:  Even though their groups had scored lowest, outfits made by Elisa, Victorya, and Sweet P were liked by the judges.
:  Jack left the competition for medical reasons. Chris, who was previously eliminated in Episode 4, returned to take his place.
: Christian originally was one of the higher scores for this challenge, but landed in the bottom two due to communication issues with his client.
:  Sweet P's design was considered good even though her group received a low score.
:  The judges declared a tie between Rami and Chris, and asked each to design a collection for Bryant Park; one of the two would be chosen to show at Bryant Park Fashion Week based on his three strongest pieces
: Although Rami had one of the lowest scores for the challenge, he was automatically safe as he had immunity.

 The model won Project Runway Season 4.
 The model wore the winning design that challenge.
 The model wore the losing design that challenge.
 The model was eliminated.

Designer legend
Carmen Webber: CW
Chris March: CM
Christian Siriano: CS
Elisa Jimenez: EJ
Jack Mackenroth: JM
Jillian Lewis: JL
Kevin Christiana: KC
Kit Pistol: KP
Marion Lee: ML
Rami Kashou: RK
Ricky Lizalde: RL
Simone LeBlanc: SL
Steven Rosengard: SR
Sweet P: SP
Victorya Hong: VH

:  Cheron, Anna Lita, Marie, and Jacqueline were used in this challenge to show off the designers' strongest pieces of their collection. However, they will not be in contention for the finale win.

Episodes

Episode 1: Sew Us What You Got 
The designers arrive in New York and are asked to create a garment that best reflects who they are as a designer. They are given 10 minutes to grab from $50,000 worth of fabric in three tents set up in Bryant Park. The designers are randomly assigned models.

Judges: Heidi Klum, Nina Garcia, Michael Kors
Guest Judge: Monique Lhuillier
WINNER: Rami
OUT: Simone
First aired November 14, 2007

Episode 2: I Started Crying / Money Changes Everything
The remaining designers are asked to create a two-piece garment for Sarah Jessica Parker's BITTEN line using $15 of materials and only one day to complete their look. All fourteen designers pitched their designs to Parker, who chose seven to work in teams of two to create the design. The winning design was sold beginning in November 2007 at Steve & Barry's stores.

Judges: Heidi Klum, Nina Garcia, Michael Kors
Guest Judge: Sarah Jessica Parker
WINNER: Victorya (teamed with Kevin Christiana)
OUT: Marion (teamed with Steven Rosengard)
First aired November 21, 2007

Episode 3: Fashion Giant
The remaining designers are asked to create a three piece menswear outfit for guest judge Tiki Barber to wear on The Today Show. The designers are randomly assigned male models.

Judges: Heidi Klum, Nina Garcia, Michael Kors
Guest Judge: Tiki Barber
WINNER: Jack
OUT: Carmen
First aired November 28, 2007

Episode 4: Trendsetter
Each designer picks one of 12 outdated fashion trends. Then working in four teams of three, each team must incorporate all three styles into a cohesive collection of three outfits. They have $225 and two days for the project.

Note 1: Although Victorya, Elisa and Sweet P's overall group performance was LOW, their garments were considered good by the judges.
Note 2: Following the runway presentation, the judges announced that because they all unanimously loved Jillian's look, she was immediately named the winner.
Judges: Heidi Klum, Nina Garcia, Michael Kors
Guest Judge: Donna Karan
WINNER: Jillian (teamed with Rami and Kevin)
OUT: Chris (teamed with Steven and Sweet P)
First aired December 5, 2007

Episode 5: What's the Skinny?
Each designer has to create an outfit for a woman who has recently lost weight, using one of the woman's outfits from before her weight loss as raw material for the new design. The new outfit must incorporate aspects of the now-thin woman's personality, as well as the designer's own style. Each designer is given $10 to use for additional materials. They have one day to complete the outfits.

Designers and Clients:

Steve with Laura
Chris with Silvia
Jillian with Erika
Kevin with Elyse
Sweet P with Chris
Victorya with Ory
Elisa with Tracy
Ricky with Penny
Kit with Alicia
Christian with Kerry
Rami with Lisa
Judges: Heidi Klum, Nina Garcia, Michael Kors
Guest Judge: Patrick Robinson, head designer for The Gap
WINNER: Christian
LEFT: Jack left to receive medical treatment for a MRSA infection. To keep the same level of competition, he was replaced with Chris, the last designer eliminated.
OUT: Steven
First aired December 12, 2007

Episode 6: Eye Candy
Designers are to create a garment using any materials that were available at the Hershey's store in Times Square, New York City. They are given no budget but only five minutes to collect materials, and are given only one day to complete the outfit.
Judges: Heidi Klum, Nina Garcia, Michael Kors
Guest Judge: Zac Posen
WINNER: Rami
OUT: Elisa
First aired January 2, 2008

Episode 7: What a Girl Wants
Designers are challenged to design a prom dress for a group of 16- and 17-year-old girls from St. John Vianney High School in New Jersey. The girls, along with their mothers, pre-select the designers they want to work with based on the designers' portfolios. The designers have a budget of $250 for materials from Mood and two days to construct the dresses. The winner is dependent on who did the best according to the clients, and they are judged on time management.

Judges: Heidi Klum, Nina Garcia, Michael Kors
Guest Judge: Gilles Mendel
WINNER: Victorya
OUT: Kevin
First aired January 9, 2008

Episode 8: En Garde!
Each designer is randomly paired with another designer and asked to select a team leader. Each team is asked to create an avant-garde outfit based on inspiration from their models' hair styles. They are given a budget of $300 and two days to create this look. The following day, each team is asked to create another, simpler, ready-to-wear outfit which embodies the "essence" of the avant-garde look they have been working on. For the second piece, the designers have a budget of $50. The leader of the winning team receives immunity in the next challenge, while the winning team and their outfits are featured in a TRESemme fashion shoot.

Teams:
Kit and Ricky (LOW)
Rami and Sweet P (LOW)
Christian and Chris (WIN)
Victorya and Jillian (HIGH)

Note: Team leaders in bold.
Note 2: Although Sweet P's overall group performance was LOW, her garment was considered good by the judges.
Judges: Heidi Klum, Nina Garcia, Michael Kors
Guest Judge: Alberta Ferretti
WINNER: Christian (teamed with Chris March)
OUT: Kit (teamed with Ricky Lizalde)
First aired January 16, 2008

Episode 9: Even Designers Get the Blues
The designers are tasked with creating an iconic look using deconstructed denim fabric and white cotton while also showing off the Levi's 501 legacy. The designers are given three minutes to collect provided denim jeans and jackets and cotton fabric hanging from clotheslines in a storeroom; Notions such as buttons, rivets, and other fasteners are provided in the workroom. The designers have one day to complete the design. From this challenge forward, the winning designer would no longer gain immunity in the following challenge.

Judges: Heidi Klum, Nina Garcia, Michael Kors
Guest Judge: Caroline Calvin
WINNER: Ricky
OUT: Victorya
First aired January 23, 2008

Episode 10: Raw Talent
Each designer selects one of six WWE Divas based on their general attitude, and must design an outfit that matches that attitude and can be worn in the wrestling ring.  The designers are given $100 for fabric and two days to complete the designs.
Judges: Heidi Klum, Nina Garcia, Michael Kors
Guest Judges: Traver Rains and Richie Rich
Guest Clients: Maria Kanellis, Kristal Marshall, Michelle McCool, Candice Michelle, Layla El, Torrie Wilson.
WINNER: Chris (Made Maria's outfit that will be worn during a WWE match)
OUT: Ricky
First aired February 6, 2008

Episode 11: The Art of Fashion
The designers are given 45 minutes in three galleries (the Greek and Roman Sculpture courtyard, the European Painting wing, and the Temple of Dendur) at the Metropolitan Museum of Art to select a piece of art to use as inspiration for a dress, using provided cameras to capture the artwork. They are given $300 for materials at Mood, and two days to complete the design.

Designers and their art inspiration:
Chris - Marie Francoise
Christian - Don Andrés de Andrade y la Cal
Jillian - The Story of the Argonauts
Rami - Aphrodite
Sweet P - Peacocks

Judges: Heidi Klum, Nina Garcia, Michael Kors
Guest Judges: Roberto Cavalli
WINNER: Christian
OUT: Sweet P
First aired February 13, 2008
All the designers who remain in the competition at the end of this episode will show collections at Bryant Park at New York Fashion Week in February 2008.
While statements throughout the show stated that only three designers would move on, the judges declared Rami and Chris tied, and thus, both will develop their line for the Bryant Park show. However, prior to the show, both will display their three best pieces to the judges, who will then decide who will actually be participating for the  Project Runway competition during Bryant Park, reducing the final judging decision to three.
While they say that only the one that wins the tie will move on, since Fashion Week was before the airing of this episode, Sweet P actually developed a line for the event, and sold at least one garment.

Episode 12: Reunion
All the designers gather for a reunion. Christian Siriano is given $10,000 as the winner of the viewer "Fan Favorite" contest by Season 3's Mychael Knight. Highlights of the season are reviewed, including different designers' reactions to being eliminated, the judges' unaired reactions to the Raw Talent episode, as well as the remaining designers' wrestling diva alter-egos; personality traits of the designers such as Chris March's laugh, Ricky Lizalde's crying, Elisa Jimenez's offbeat personality, and Christian's repeated use of the word "fierce".

Hosts Heidi Klum, Tim Gunn
Guest Judges: None
Guests: Mychael Knight, Nina Garcia, Michael Kors
FAN FAVORITE: Christian
OUT: None
First aired February 20, 2008

Episode 13: Finale (Part 1)
The four remaining designers are given five months and $8000 to create a collection of twelve looks for Fashion Week. Three and a half months later, Tim visits each of the designers to assess their progress. The designers return to New York City after five months. Chris and Rami are to select their three best outfits from their collections, and are given three hours to fit pre-selected models and prepare their hair and makeup before the runway show; they each can use the help of one of the other competitors (Jillian with Rami, Christian with Chris). The winner of this runway show, Rami, joins the other two, Jillian and Christian, in the competition at the Bryant Park show.
Guest Judges: none
ADVANCED: Rami
OUT: Chris
First aired February 27, 2008
Chris and Sweet-P showed decoy collections at Fashion Week, as their elimination episodes had not yet aired.

Episode 14: Finale (Part 2)

Judges: Heidi Klum, Nina Garcia, Michael Kors
Guest Judges: Victoria Beckham
WINNER of Project Runway Season 4: Christian Siriano
OUT: Jillian Lewis (2nd runner-up), Rami Kashou (1st runner-up)
First aired March 5, 2008
PR4 Model Winner: Lisa Pryston Nargi, who got a spread in Elle magazine, wearing Siriano's designs.

References

External links

Project Runway official web site
Christian Siriano Official Website
Rami Kashou Official Website
Chris March Official Website
Ricky Lizalde Official Website
Kevin Christiana Official Website
Jack Mackenroth Official Website
Simone LeBlanc Official Website

Project Runway (American series)
2007 American television seasons
2007 in fashion
2008 American television seasons
2008 in fashion